The River of Romance may refer to:

 The River of Romance, a 1916 silent film drama
 River of Romance, a 1929 American drama film